Aliaga is a municipality located in the province of Teruel, Aragon, eastern Spain.

In the early 15th century, the castle was held by Íñigo de Alfaro.

List of villages in the municipality 
Cirujeda

References 

Municipalities in the Province of Teruel